This is a list of welding processes, separated into their respective categories. The associated N reference numbers (second column) are specified in ISO 4063 (in the European Union published as EN ISO 4063). Numbers in parentheses are obsolete and were removed from the current (1998) version of ISO 4063. The AWS reference codes of the American Welding Society are commonly used in North America.

Arc welding

Oxyfuel gas welding

Resistance welding

Solid-state welding

Other types of welding

Notes and references

Cary, Howard B. and Scott C. Helzer (2005).  Modern Welding Technology.  Upper Saddle River, New Jersey: Pearson Education.  .
Lincoln Electric (1994). The Procedure Handbook of Arc Welding. Cleveland: Lincoln Electric. .

See also
 Welding
 List of welding codes
 Symbols and conventions used in welding documentation
 Laser cladding

External links
 Welding process information
 Resistance welding process information

 
Technology-related lists